Krivaja is a village in Serbia. It is situated in the Bačka Topola municipality, in the North Bačka District, Vojvodina province. The village has a Serb ethnic majority and its population numbering 986 people (2002 census).

Name
In Serbian the village is known as Krivaja (Криваја), in Hungarian as Bácsér or Kanyarodó, and in Croatian as Krivaja.

Historical population

1981: 680
1991: 910
2002: 986

References
Slobodan Ćurčić, Broj stanovnika Vojvodine, Novi Sad, 1996.

See also
Bačka Topola municipality
List of places in Serbia
List of cities, towns and villages in Vojvodina

Places in Bačka